Strathearn is a single malt Scotch whisky distillery near Methven in Scotland.

History
The distillery commenced production in 2013 under the ownership of Tony Reeman-Clark, David Land and David Wight. Initially the distillery produced gin and the first whisky was distilled in October 2013.

In 2019, the distillery was acquired by the Glasgow company Douglas Laing & Co.

Distillery
The distillery was built within a 160-year-old stone farm steading. The location was the site of an early distillery founded by William White in 1798 that became disused. The distillery has a stainless steel mash tun, two stainless steel washbacks and two stills. The stills are of an alembic type and made in Portugal by the company Hoga, having been originally designed for the Portugese Sherry industry.

The water for the whisky comes from nearby Loch Turret.

The distillery offers tours.

Products
The author Charles Maclean states that the distillery has probably the longest fermentation time of any distillery at 96 hours. The first whisky was released in 2017.

The distillery also produces gin. These include a Classic gin, a Citrus gin, a Heather Rose gin and an Oaked Highland gin.

The distillery also blends honey for a honey based whisky.

References

Distilleries in Scotland
Scottish malt whisky
Gins